The 12th Division was an infantry division of the United States Army, active in 1918–1919. Established at Camp Devens, Massachusetts, training was interrupted by the World War I Armistice and the division was quickly afterwards disestablished.

History

The division was organized on July 12, 1918. The Regular 36th Infantry and 42d Infantry were ordered to Camp Devens in the latter part of July to become part of the 12th Division. (The 42nd Infantry had been assigned to the division on 5 July 1918). A certain number of non-commissioned officers and privates was taken from each company of the two regiments and assigned to the 73rd Infantry and 74th, both war-raised National Army, as a nucleus. The 12th Field Artillery Brigade, which was to become the divisional artillery, was organized and trained at Camp McClellan, Ala. It never actually joined the division at Camp Devens. It consisted of the 34th, 35th, and 36th Field Artillery Regiments and a trench mortar battery. By 1 September 1918 the training of the division for overseas service was well under way. Only after the Armistice of 11 November 1918 did orders arrive for the demobilization of the division. By 31 January 1919, all non-Regular commissioned and enlisted personnel had been discharged.

Major-General Henry P. McCain commanded this division from the time of its organization until it was demobilized. Interim commanders included George L. Byroade, Almon L. Parmerter, and John E. Woodward. McCain remained in command of Camp Devens after the division was disestablished.

Post World War II
From 1946–1947 the Philippine Division was re-designated the 12th Infantry Division.

References

Infantry divisions of the United States Army
Military units and formations established in 1918
Military units and formations disestablished in 1919
United States Army divisions of World War I